Singou Reserve is a complete reserve in Burkina Faso.

See also
 Arly-Singou
 Arli National Park

References

Protected areas of Burkina Faso
Gourma Province
Protected areas established in 1955
1955 establishments in French Upper Volta